John A. Nevius (July 15, 1920 – April 23, 1993) was a member and chair of Washington, DC's pre-Home Rule city council.  Nevius was first appointed to the council by President Lyndon Johnson from 1967 to 1969.  In 1972, President Richard Nixon appointed him as Chairman of the council.  In 1974, the advent of home rule brought DC's first elected council and council chairman.  Nevius, a self-described "WASP Republican," did not run for the position, and he was succeeded by Sterling Tucker.

He ran for the first D.C. Delegate to Congress, losing to the Reverend Walter E. Fauntroy, in 1970.  He was also a long time member of the Washington Metropolitan Area Transit Administration (WMATA) board of directors during construction of Washington's Metro system, including serving as chairman.

Prior to his public life, Nevius graduated from Princeton University's class of 1942. He was a naval officer in the Pacific during WWII, and a lawyer afterwards. 

Married to Sheila Sheldon in 1950, Nevius had two children, Katherine and Theodore (Ted). He and his second wife Sally (née Cunningham) had one daughter, Kristina. Sally later gained some notoriety by co-founding the Parents Music Resource Center together with Tipper Gore and several other "Washington wives."

Nevius died at the age of 72 from complications due to lymphoma and ALS (Lou Gehrig's Disease).

Notes

1920 births
1993 deaths
Lawyers from Washington, D.C.
Washington, D.C., Republicans
20th-century American lawyers